Trachyrrhopala is a genus of moths belonging to the family Tineidae. It contains only one species, Trachyrrhopala pauroleuca, which is found on the island of Borneo.

References

Tineidae
Monotypic moth genera
Moths of Asia
Tineidae genera
Taxa named by Edward Meyrick